Laihia is a municipality of Finland, founded in 1576 through a separation from Isokyrö and Korsholm.

It is located in the Ostrobothnia region. Laihia consists of 37 villages.

Laihia is within the economical region of the neighbouring city Vaasa. The municipality is unilingually Finnish. Only  people speak Swedish as a native language. Most inhabitants speak Finnish or a dialect typical of this region. The municipal manager is Juha Rikala. There are a total of 469 farms in the municipality..

Laihia is located along the international tourist route Blue Highway, which goes from Norway to Russia via Sweden and Finland.

People
In Finland, Laihians are renowned for their stinginess (or ) and there are hundreds of jokes told about them. However, Laihians are not usually offended by it. To the contrary, they are proud of their frugality and even have a Museum of Stinginess (Nuukuuren museo). In any case, Laihia has high-level public services for education, health, sports, seniors etc.

Notable people
 Santeri Alkio, politician and journalist
 Mark Hoppus (born 1972), American singer and musician, of Finnish descent through great-grandparents who emigrated from Laihia
 Toivo Kärki, musician
 Matti Vanhala, Bank of Finland Governor 1998–2004
 Keijo Suila, former CEO of Finnair
Johan Laibecchius (born in Laihia on 19 March 1658), vicar
Kristian Chyraeus (died in Laihia in 1687), vicar
Samuel Backman (died in Laihia 3 April 1712), vicar
Jonas Lagus (died in Laihia 22 April 1798), vicar and dean

Surnames
The most common surnames in Laihia and their frequencies as of 2014:
 1. Kallio (1:112)
 2. Puska (1:121)
 3. Kinnari (1:135)
 4. Koskela (1:137)
 5. Luoma (1:142)
 5. Niemelä (1:142)
 7. Kauppi (1:145)
 8. Mäkinen (1:156)
 9. Mäkelä (1:159)
 10. Kankaanpää (1:163)

Transport
The private coach company OnniBus route Helsinki—Seinäjoki—Vaasa has a stop at Laihia.

References

External links

Municipality of Laihia – Official website 
Sunrise, sunset, dawn and dusk times
Laihia Energy-saving Village, publication of European Commission

Municipalities of Ostrobothnia (region)
Populated places established in 1576